Alexander Hug (born 11 May 1975) is a Swiss ski mountaineer.

Biography 
Hug was born in Walenstadt and used for his first ski mountaineering attempts on the Garmil years self-tinkered touring bindings, when he was eleven years old. He started armateur ski mountaineering sports in 1990 and competed first at the "Arflina race". In 1999 and 2000 he won the "Pizol Challenge", and has been member of the national team since 2000. He enjoys also mountain biking, climbing and mountain running. Together with Beat Good and Andreas Zimmermann he created the "Pizol Altiski", which he organized in 2003. In autumn of 2005 he was trained as a landscape gardener in London. He currently works at Golf Club Bad Ragaz. He lives in Sargans.

Selected results 
 2002:
 7th, World Championship single race
 7th, World Championship team race (together with Pius Schuwey)
 8th, World Championship combination ranking
 2003:
 5th, European Championship team race (together with Pierre-Marie Taramarcaz)
 10th, European Championship combination ranking
 2004:
 3rd, World Championship relay race (together with Rico Elmer, Alain Richard and Pierre Bruchez)
 5th, World Championship (together with Christian Pittex)
 2005:
 1st, Swiss Championship single
 2nd, European Championship relay race (together with Christian Pittex, Jean-Yves Rey and Yannick Ecoeur)
 3rd, European Championship single race
 4th, European Championship vertical race
 4th, World Cup race, Salt Lake City
 6th, World Cup team (together with Florent Troillet)
 2006:
 1st, Swiss Championship vertical race
 2nd, Adamello Ski Raid (together with Christian Pittex and Didier Moret)
 3rd, World Championship relay race (together with Alain Rey, Rico Elmer and Florent Troillet)
 4th, World Championship team race (together with Rico Elmer)
 2007:
 5th, European Championship team race (together with Florent Troillet)
 9th European Championship combination ranking
 2008:
 1st, Trophée des Gastlosen, together with Florent Troillet

Pierra Menta 

 2001: 10th, together with Olivier Nägele
 2007: 6th, together with Alain Rey

Trofeo Mezzalama 

 2001: 8th, together with Olivier Nägele and Nicolao Leone Lanfranchi 
 2005: 2nd, together with Florent Troillet and Christian Pittex
 2011: 8th, together with Marcel Theux and Didier Moret

Patrouille des Glaciers 

 2000: 6th (and 2nd international military teams ranking), together with Pvt E-2 Laurent Perruchoud and Pvt E-2 Daniel Hediger
 2004: 4th, together with Florent Troillet and Christian Pittex
 2006: 2nd, together with Didier Moret and Christian Pittex
 2008: 1st, together with Florent Troillet and Didier Moret

External links 
 Alexander Hug at Skimountaineering.org

References 

1975 births
Living people
Swiss male ski mountaineers
Swiss military patrol (sport) runners
People from Walenstadt
Sportspeople from the canton of St. Gallen